Luis Marcus Nicola Lawrie-Lattanzio (born 20 February 2002) is an Australian soccer player who plays for Campbelltown City in NPL South Australia.

Early life
Lawrie-Lattanzio played youth soccer with Metrostars, before joining the Football South Australia National Training Centre program. Afterwards, he joined the youth system of Adelaide United, before later joining Melbourne Victory FC. He had a prominent season in the 2019–20 Y-League helping the Victory reach the Grand Final and being awarded with the Melbourne Victory FC Y-League Victory Medal & TAC Y-League Golden Boot.

Club career
In 2018 and 2019, he appeared in the NPL South Australia with Adelaide United NPL.

In October 2019, Lawrie-Lattanzio joined A-League Men side Melbourne Victory. He made his professional debut on 25 July 2020 against Western United and later made his AFC Champions League debut against Beijing Guoan on 27 November. He scored his first professional goal on 6 February 2021 against the Brisbane Roar. In May 2022, he departed the club, upon the expiry of his contract.

In June 2022, he signed with Campbelltown City in the second-tier NPL South Australia.

On 6 July 2022, he signed with Canadian Premier League club York United. He made his debut on 15 July against Pacific FC, coming on as a substitute. He scored his first goal on 1 August against the HFX Wanderers. In December 2022, York announced that would not be exercising Lawrie-Lattanzio's contract option for 2023.

In 2023, he returned to Campbelltown City in the second-tier NPL South Australia. On 10 March 2023, he scored two goals in a 3-0 victory over FK Beograd.

International career
Lawrie-Lattanzio began his international career with the Joeys in 2019, where he was announced in the squad for the 2019 FIFA U-17 World Cup. Lawrie-Lattanzio featured in the first match against Ecuador U17.

Personal life
Lawrie-Lattanzio is an Indigenous Australian, and is also of Italian descent through his father. He attended Blackfriars Priory School.

References

External links

NPL Statistics
NPL Statistics 2023

2002 births
Living people
Soccer players from Adelaide
Australian soccer players
Indigenous Australian soccer players
Australian people of Italian descent
Association football midfielders
Adelaide United FC players
Melbourne Victory FC players
National Premier Leagues players
A-League Men players
York United FC players
Canadian Premier League players